Fred Cummings (also known as Frederick W. Cummings; November 21, 1931 - January 31, 2019) was a theoretical physicist and professor at the University of California, Riverside. He specialised in cavity quantum electrodynamics, many-body theory, non-linear dynamics, and biophysics.

Discoveries
Cummings obtained his PhD with Edwin Thompson Jaynes at Stanford University in 1962. After thirty years at University of California Riverside Physics department, Cummings became emeritus professor in 1993. He then lived in Marin County, California.
Some of his important discoveries include the "Jaynes–Cummings model", one atom interacting with a quantized e-m field; as well as the extension of this to N atoms, the "Tavis-Cummings model". In the last twenty years his interest has turned to questions of biophysics of development and evolution.

Academic career
Cummings was full professor at U.C. Riverside when he retired (emeritus) after thirty years at UCR.

Research interests

 Biophysics of development
 Theoretical physics
 Cavity quantum electrodynamics
 Many-body theory
 Non-linear dynamics

Education
BS:  Louisiana State University, 1955; Ph.D.:  Stanford University, 1960

Biography
 Born, New Orleans, Louisiana, 1931
 U.S. Army, 1950–1952, in infantry in Korea
 1952–1955 LSU physics and math major (BS)
 1955–1960 Physics Department, Stanford University (Ph.D.)
 1960–1963 Aeronutronic Research Labs, Ford Motor Co., Newport Beach, California
 1963–1993, professor, UCR, Riverside, California
 Married in 1964 to Kathleen Sturgis of Riverside, California; one child, Anne M. Cummings, M.D. (born February 14, 1966, in Riverside), presently living in Greenbrae, California, with her husband and three kids
 Fred died on January 31, 2019, in Marin County, CA: https://www.legacy.com/obituaries/pe/obituary.aspx?n=frederick-w-cummings&pid=191508393

Selected publications
	F.W. Cummings, "Comparison of Quantum and Semiclassical Radiation Theories with application to the Beam Maser", PhD thesis, Stanford University, 1962.
	E.T. Jaynes and F.W. Cummings, "Comparison of Quantum and Semiclassical Radiation Theories with application to the Beam Maser", IEEE 51, 89 (1963).
	F.W. Cummings, "Interaction of a two level atom with a stochastic e-m field", Amer. J. Physics, (1963).
	E.R. Buley and F.W. Cummings, "Dynamics of a system of N atoms interacting with a radiation field", Phys. Rev. 44, (1964).
	F.W. Cummings, "A single mode radiation field coupled to a two level atom", Phys. Rev. 140 A1051 (1965).
	F.W. Cummings and J.R. Johnston, "Theory of Superfluidity", Phys. Rev. 151, 105 (1966), and reprinted in Coherent States: applications in Physics and Mathematical Physics, (eds. J.R. Klauder and Bo-Sture Skagerstam, World Scientific, Singapore 1985).
	M. Tavis and F.W. Cummings, "N atoms interacting with a single mode radiation field", Phys. Rev. 170, 379 (1968).
	F.W. Cummings, "Macroscopic Wave Functions" in Statistical Mechanics: new concepts, new problems, new applications", IUPAP conference Proceedings, eds., S. Rice, K. Freed and J. Light (Univ. of Chicago Press, Chicago, 1972). (cf: E.C. Svensson and Sears, Physica 137B, 1986).
	F.W. Cummings, "Aspects of Condensation in 4He II", in Cooperative Phenomena, eds. H. Haken and M. Wagner (Springer-Verlag, Berlin, Heidelberg, New York, 1973).
	F.W. Cummings, "On morphogenesis in living systems", in Energy Transfer Dynamics: studies and essays in honor of Herbert Fröhlich, eds. T. Barrett and H.A. Pohl, (Springer-Verlag, Berlin, London, New York, Tokyo, 1987).
	F.W. Cummings, "On suppression of spontaneous emission" Phys. Rev. Lett. (1985*).
	F.W. Cummings and A.K. Rajagopal, "Production of number states of the electromagnetic field", Phys. Rev. A39, 3414 (1989).
	F.W. Cummings, D.D. Dixon, and P.E. Kaus, "A model of neutron star dynamics" Astrophy. Jour. 386, 221 (1992).
	Frederick W. Cummings, "A model of growth and form based on adhesion molecules", J. Theor. Biol. 178, 229–238 (1996).
	F. W. Cummings and J.C. Strickland, "A Model of Phyllotaxis", J. Theor. Biol., 192, 531–544 (1998).
	F.W. Cummings, "Waves of pattern formation and signaling pathways", J. Theor. Biol. 196, 27–31 (1999).
	A.K. Rajagopal, K.L. Jensen, and F. W. Cummings, "Quantum entangled states in the Jaynes-Cummings model", Phys. Lett. A 259, 285 290 (1999).
	F. W. Cummings, "A model of pattern formation based on signaling pathways", J. Theor. Biol. 207, 107–116 (2000).
	Frederick W. Cummings, "The Interaction of Surface Geometry with Morphogens" J. Theor. Biol. 212, 303–313 (2001).
	F.W. Cummings, "A Model of Morphogenesis", Physica A, vol.339, 531–547 (2004).
	F.W. Cummings, "Interaction of morphogens with geometry", Physica A, vol. 355/2-4, 427–438 (2005).
	F.W. Cummings, "On the origin of pattern and form in early Metazoans", Int'l J. Develop. Biol. 50 (2/3) 193-208 (2006).
	Frederick W. Cummings, "A Model of Pattern Coupled to Form in Metazoans", in: Mathematical Modelling of Biosystems, pp. 45−86; eds. R. P. Mondaini and P. M. Pardalos, Springer, 2008.
	Michael Tavis and Frederick Cummings, 2013, "Stimulated and spontaneous emission of radiation in a single mode", J. Phys. B (Special issue on 'Fifty Years of the Jaynes-Cummings model'), 46 224011.

References

20th-century American physicists
21st-century American physicists
Theoretical physicists

Stanford University alumni
University of California, Riverside faculty
1931 births
2019 deaths